This is a list of defunct airlines of Senegal.

See also

 List of airlines of Senegal
 List of airports in Senegal

References

Senegal
Airlines
Airlines, defunct